Back to Skool is a video game, sequel to the Skool Daze, created by David Reidy (whose wife Helen was a school teacher at the time) with graphics by Keith Warrington for the ZX Spectrum and released by Microsphere in 1985. The gameplay is very similar to - if more advanced than - Skool Daze, incorporating most of the same characters, gameplay elements and graphics.

The game is ranked 19th in the "Your Sinclair official top 100" Spectrum games of all time.

Gameplay
The game differs from its predecessor by an increase in the size of the play area (including a neighbouring girls' school) and a number of gameplay changes.

The girls' school incorporates its own new characters including undistinguished girls with hockey sticks, Hayley (girlfriend of the main character Eric) and Miss Take (the headmistress). Only at break time and lunch times are the girls allowed to mingle with the boys, in the central grassy playground, separated at other times by a high gate. The opening and closing of the gate is controlled by the school caretaker Albert, a new character to the game. It is also possible for Eric to sneak over the gate into the girls' school during lesson times, either using the bicycle (after completing the challenge of finding its lock's combination and then performing a tricky manoeuvre on it), by watering the flower beside the gate and then jumping on it, or by kissing Hayley through the gate. When the girls and boys are allowed to mingle and when Eric gains access to the girls' school, he can kiss Hayley, who will then agree to do 1000 of his lines for him. This reduction method can be used up to six times before Hayley refuses to help Eric any more.

Elements added in Back to Skool include stink bombs (used to trigger the opening of windows), water pistols, mice that can be released in the girls' school causing widespread panic, and sherry (which can be squirted into cups and used to "intoxicate" teachers by splashing it on them with correct timing).

Suicide
It is possible to commit suicide by opening the top-storey window and making Eric jump out. (Jumping out of a window is necessary to sneak into the girls' school, but only from the first floor - not the second.) When this happens, Eric will lie incapacitated on the ground outside the boys' school until Mr Wacker approaches and tells him "You are not a bird, Eric. You're expelled", and the game ends.

Bugs
There is a bug in the game that enables you to see what goes on in the girls' school without leaving the boys' school. To do this go as far left as possible in the Blue Room, then face right and press the key that would have Eric pick up a mouse or frog (C), or K (kiss). The whole screen will scroll if you press any button until it goes all the way to the girls' school. Once the scrolling is complete Eric can move around as usual, unseen, and will not pick up any lines. You can, through trial and error, get to the girls' school upon which the game will go back to normal. This is best attempted at playtime, (so the gate between the two schools is open,) and really isn't that difficult to do provided you know your way around the boys' school.

Another bug exists whereby it is possible to make a teacher completely disappear from the blue room. Once a lesson in that room has started, position yourself so that the lesson starts properly but the teacher is out of sight to the left. Leave the room just enough to let Einstein start reporting "Please Sir... Eric is not here." If you re-enter the room before Einstein has finished his sentence, still keeping the teacher out of sight, the teacher will - instead of issuing lines - turn around, start cleaning the blackboard, continuing to wipe the wall, then will walk through the wall on the far left-hand side. After a while, the teacher eventually re-emerges through the wall at the right of Miss Take's office in the girls' school, then makes his way back to the boys' school and continues as normal.

References

External links
 
 

1985 video games
Action-adventure games
Europe-exclusive video games
School-themed video games
Video games developed in the United Kingdom
ZX Spectrum-only games
ZX Spectrum games